Jeffrey L. Hjelm (born September 30, 1955) is a former Associate Justice of the Maine Supreme Judicial Court.

Education 

Hjelm is a graduate of Hampden Academy. He received his Bachelor of Arts from Hamilton College in 1977 and his Juris Doctor from Case Western Reserve University School of Law in 1980.

Judicial career 

Hjelm was appointed to the Maine District Court in 1992 and to the Maine Superior Court in 1998. He was reappointed to the Superior Court in 2005 and 2012. On May 7, 2014, Hjelm was nominated by Paul LePage to be an associate justice of the Maine Supreme Judicial Court. On August 1, 2014, Hjelm was sworn in by Governor Paul LePage as an associate justice. On September 20, 2019, Hjelm announced his intention to retire upon the confirmation of his successor. He retired in December 2019. He was later sworn in as an Active Retired Justice of the Maine Supreme Judicial Court.

References

External links
 Official Supreme Court Biography 
 

1955 births
21st-century American judges
Living people
Case Western Reserve University School of Law alumni
Hamilton College (New York) alumni
Justices of the Maine Supreme Judicial Court
Hampden Academy alumni